"Song Companion" is a 2007 DVD and music book by Australian musician Diesel. The DVD includes biographical information about Diesel, and background information about the songs; Lyrics, melody line, chord symbols, guitar chord diagrams (with notated rhythm), and some guitar tablature for breaks and fills.

Track listing
 DVD
 "One More Time"
 "Saviour"
 "Tip Of My Tongue"
 "15 Feet of Snow"
 "Darling Of The Universe"
 "Cry In Shame"

References

Music video compilation albums
2007 video albums